Sandesh Kadur is an Indian wildlife film producer and conservation photographer known for his contributions to BBC Planet Earth II. Sandesh's films have been shown on various television networks including National Geographic Channel, BBC, Discovery Channel and Animal Planet.

Sandesh is a Senior Fellow of The International League of Conservation Photographers (ILCP) and co-founder of Felis Creations, a visual arts company based in Bangalore, India, which work on a variety of projects ranging from natural history documentaries to art and still photography.

Life
Sandesh exposes the need for conservation and encourages the protection of the world’s biodiversity. Over the years, Sandesh’s work has garnered many top awards including the CIWEM Environmental Photographer of the Year, Nature’s Best Award, International Conservation Photographer Award, as well as twice being nominated for a Green Oscar at Wildscreen.

Early life 
He is the second child of Dr. Bangalore Narayan Viswanath, a documentary filmmaker and notable entomologist from Bangalore. He was motivated when his father presented him an SLR film camera and a bundle of National Geographic films during his birthday. He has traveled extensively in the Western Ghats and the Himalayas.

Education 
Sandesh Kadur did his schooling from The Home School, Bangalore and graduated in Wildlife Biology from The University of Texas at Brownsville.

Recognitions
In 2013 Sandesh was recognized by the National Geographic Society as an Emerging Explorer and also received the North American Nature Photographers (NANPA) Vision Award in recognition of early career excellence, and continuation of vision and inspiration to others in nature photography, conservation, and education.

Wildlife documentaries

Books

Publications 
 2013 BBC Wildlife Magazine March 2013 / Snake Charms
 2013 BBC Knowledge August 2013 / Saving the Unicorn
 2013 Nature 's Best Photography / Indian Fol Pups
 2013 Saevus March/April 2013 / Of Clouds and Silver Linings 
 2012 National Geographic Traveller September 2012   /  Macro Photography
 2012 BBC Wildlife Magazine August 2012 / Cloud Pleases
 2010 Current Conservation Volume 5 Issue 1 2010 / Hunting in India

Contributions as photographer 
 2011 Handbook of the Mammals of the world Vol 2
 2011 Conservation Biology / Universities Press
 2010 Survey of The Environment The Hindu
 2009 Handbook of the Mammals of the world Vol 1

Awards

Personal 
 2013 National Geographic Emerging Explorer 
 2005 Infosys - Young Achiever of the Year Award –India

Photography 
 2013 North American Nature Photographers Association(NANPA) -Vision Award
 2013 Nature’s Best Windland Smith Rice Awards – Wildlife 
 2012 International Conservation Photography Awards –Honorable Mention
 2010 International Conservation Photography Award – 1st Place 
 2010 Highly Commended – BBC Wildlife photographer of the Year – One Earth Award
 2009 International Wildlife Film Festival - Merit Award for New Talent, Sandesh Kadur
 2008 Environmental Photographer of the Year CIWEM – Winner – Natural World
 2003 Brownsville International Art Contest 
 2002 Wildbird Annual Photography Contest

References

External links

 Sandesh Kadur official website
 Felis Creations official website
 National Geographic Emerging Explorer
 Planet Earth II

Indian documentary filmmakers
Indian nature photographers
Film directors from Bangalore
Living people
1976 births
21st-century Indian film directors
Photographers from Karnataka